Skrolsvik or Skrollsvika is a village on the southwestern tip of the island of Senja in Troms og Finnmark county, Norway.  The village is located in Senja Municipality, west of the villages of Å and Stonglandseidet.  This village has an important ferry connection with the nearby town of Harstad which is located across the Vågsfjorden to the southwest.  Skrolsvik Chapel is located in this village.

References

Senja
Villages in Troms